Mentz is an unincorporated community in northeast Colorado County, in the U.S. state of Texas. It is situated northeast of Columbus on the north side of Interstate 10 (I-10). The town was first established in 1846 by German immigrants from near Mainz, Germany. The small community was still served by a Catholic Church in 2016.

Geography
The community is north of the intersection of I-10 with Farm to Market Road 949 (FM 949) and west of Bernardo.

History
As early as the 1830s, Germans began to settle near Cat Spring to the northeast. The next impulse of German immigrants was initiated by the Adelsverein in the 1840s. German Catholics, mostly from Büdesheim in the Roman Catholic Diocese of Mainz formed a settlement in 1846. It was named Neu Mainz after Mainz, Germany. When the town received a post office in 1853, it was named San Bernard. The name was changed to Neu Mainz in 1860 and the post office was discontinued in 1866. In 1858, the settlers founded the Saint Roch Catholic Church with the assistance of priests from the town of Frelsburg to the northwest. The church was named after a chapel near Büdesheim and Bingen am Rhein.

In 1872 the Congregation of Divine Providence founded a Catholic school in the community; it closed in 1916. The post office was set up again in 1889. By this date the town's name had been corrupted to Mentz. The post office closed in 1896 and reopened between 1897 and 1913. In the latter year postal service permanently transferred to Alleyton, a town to the southwest. By 1986 Mentz had 167 registered voters and the church with its sanctuary, parish hall, rectory, cemetery and baseball field. The area's population was 100 in 2000.

References

Unincorporated communities in Texas
Unincorporated communities in Colorado County, Texas